Porter Mountain is one of the Adirondack High Peaks. It is number 38 in order of height, and one of the easier hikes of the Adirondack Forty-Sixers. It is named after Noah Porter, one of the first to climb it, later president of Yale University.

It is often climbed to with Cascade Mountain. While it lacks the pseudo-alpine open summit of Cascade, there are nevertheless wide views available from the summit, particularly of the Johns Brook Valley to the east (which Porter blocks from Cascade); it is often less crowded than Cascade.

It is also possible to follow this trail from its other terminus, over neighboring Blueberry Mountain from Keene Valley, although that involves a greater vertical ascent and a longer trip. The trailhead to Blueberry Mountain and subsequently Porter Mountain is accessible from a parking lot next to Marcy Airfield on route 73.

References

External links

Mountains of Essex County, New York
Adirondack High Peaks
Mountains of New York (state)